Lake McMurty is a reservoir in Noble County. The lake is located to the north-west of Stillwater, and north of Lake Carl Blackwell.

Recreation 
The lake is a popular fishing, boating and camping location.

References 

McMurty
McMurty